Pyrosis is a genus of moths in the family Lasiocampidae. The genus was first described by Oberthür in 1880.  The moths live in Asia.

Species
Pyrosis borneana (Holloway, 1987)
Pyrosis dierli Zolotuhin & Witt, 2000
Pyrosis eximia Oberthür, 1880
Pyrosis hreblayi Zolotuhin & Witt, 2000
Pyrosis hyalata Zolotuhin & Witt, 2000
Pyrosis fulviplaga (De Joannis, 1929)
Pyrosis idiota (Graeser, 1888)
Pyrosis matronata Zolotuhin & Witt, 2000
Pyrosis ni (Wang & Fan, 1995)
Pyrosis potanini Alpheraky, 1895
Pyrosis rotundipennis (De Joannis, 1930)
Pyrosis undulosa (Walker, 1855)
Pyrosis wangi Zolotuhin & Witt, 2007

References

Lasiocampidae